

Players

Competitions

Division Three

League table

Results summary

League position by match

Matches

FA Cup

Worthington Cup

Auto Windscreens Shield

Appearances, goals and cards

Transfers

Transfers in

Transfers out

Loans in

References

Northampton Town F.C. seasons
Northampton Town